Adam Warren (born 7 March 1991) is a Wales international rugby union player currently playing for the Dragons. His position is at centre.

Warren came through the youth ranks at Llangennech. After a storming debut season in the First XV he won the 2009-2010 player of the season award and earned himself a move to Llandovery for the 2010-2011 season and he progressed to the Scarlets regional team. In June 2015 he joined the Dragons.

International

Warren has represented the Wales national rugby sevens team and Wales national under-20 rugby union team. He made his debut for Wales against the Barbarians on 2 June 2012 at the Millennium Stadium as a second-half replacement.

In May 2013 he was selected in the Wales national rugby union team for the summer 2013 tour to Japan.

References

External links
 Scarlets Profile
 Llandovery profile
 Dragons profile

1991 births
Living people
Dragons RFC players
Llandovery RFC players
Llanelli RFC players
Rugby union players from Burry Port
Scarlets players
Wales international rugby union players
Welsh rugby union players
Rugby union centres